Jonathan Emanuel Rodríguez (born 7 June 1990) is an Argentine professional footballer who plays as a midfielder for Liga I club Sepsi OSK.

Career
Rodríguez spent the first part of his career in Argentina's lower leagues, where he represented San Martín de Burzaco, Defensores de Belgrano, CAI, Deportivo Madryn and Agropecuario. He moved abroad for the first time in the summer of 2017, aged 27, joining Botoșani in Romania.

Rodríguez was named to the Liga I Team of the Year in the 2019–20 season and gained captaincy at the club. He amassed 126 games and ten goals in all competitions over the course of four campaigns, before signing for fellow league team CFR Cluj as a free agent in June 2021.

Honours
Agropecuario
Torneo Federal A: 2016–17
CFR Cluj
Liga I: 2021–22
Supercupa României runner-up: 2021

Individual
Liga I Team of the Season: 2019–20

References

External links

FC Botoșani official profile

1990 births
Living people
Argentine footballers
Association football midfielders
San Martín de Burzaco footballers
Comisión de Actividades Infantiles footballers
Deportivo Madryn players
Club Agropecuario Argentino players
Defensores de Belgrano footballers
Torneo Federal A players
Liga I players
FC Botoșani players
CFR Cluj players
FC Dinamo București players
Sepsi OSK Sfântu Gheorghe players
Argentine expatriate footballers
Argentine expatriate sportspeople in Romania
Expatriate footballers in Romania
People from Lomas de Zamora
Sportspeople from Buenos Aires Province